Kepler-296c is a confirmed exoplanet located in the binary star system Kepler-296. It was discovered in 2014 by the Kepler space telescope using the transit method. During a study by members of the NASA Ames Research Center on two other planets in the Kepler-296 system, Kepler-296f and Kepler-296e, they confirmed that Kepler-296c was an exoplanet with "more than 99% confidence".

References

Exoplanets discovered in 2014
Exoplanets discovered by the Kepler space telescope
Kepler-296